Pterotragus is a genus of beetles in the family Cerambycidae, containing a single species, Pterotragus lugens. It was described by Chevrolat in 1856.

References

Ceroplesini
Beetles described in 1856
Monotypic Cerambycidae genera